Kyle Pryor (born 10 January 1984) is an English actor. He is known for his roles as Nate Cooper in the Australian soap Home and Away and Laurie Shelby in the Channel 4 British soap opera, Hollyoaks. Before these appearances, he was a stunt man on several films including Underworld: Rise of the Lycans. He also acted on several New Zealand based television dramas, including This Is Not My Life and Go Girls.

Early life
Pryor began training in the Korean Martial Art of Taekwondo at age 14. He competed in various National competitions, winning the British and English Championships in his weight and grade category. In 2003, he was awarded a 'Distinction' Black Belt. He studied Martial Arts for many years as well as gymnastics.

Between 2003 and 2006, he went to University of Worcester to complete a Joint Honours Bachelor of Arts in Media and Culture and Sports Science. Before pursuing acting, he was employed at a prison and at a scuba-diving centre. In late 2011, Pryor got full New Zealand Citizenship.

Career
Pryor emigrated to New Zealand in 2006 and he became a stuntman due to his fitness training and Martial arts skills on Underworld: Rise of the Lycans in 2009 and The Warrior's Way in 2010.
He then studied with acting teacher, Mr Michael Saccente, (who has also taught Karl Urban, and Josh Thomson). Pryor won the National Award for Most Extraordinary Performance for his portrayal of Alex Puddle in CUZ at New Zealand's 48 Hour Furious Film Making Competition Grand Final in 2009.

He got his first major acting role as Marcus in the series Spartacus: Blood and Sand in 2010. In 2011, he appeared in Go Girls. He later starred in This Is Not My Life, a local New Zealand production, and in the ABC series Legend of the Seeker, part of which was filmed in Bulgaria.

In 2012, the actor moved to Australia he audition for the role of Kyle Braxton. He was considering returning to the UK, when he auditioned for the role of Andy Barrett in Home and Away in September 2013. He was unsuccessful, but was later cast as doctor Nate Cooper. Pryor made his final appearance as Nate on 5 June 2017.

On 7 August 2018, it was announced that Pryor had joined the cast of British soap opera Hollyoaks. He left the show when his character Laurie Shelby was killed off in August 2019. Pryor made a guest appearance in fellow British soap opera Emmerdale as Darren in December 2022.

Personal life
Pryor was previously engaged to creative director Julia-Rose O'Connor. He has been in a relationship with his former Hollyoaks co-star Anna Passey since 2019.

Filmography

References

External links
 

1984 births
Living people
People from Surrey
English male film actors
English male television actors
Naturalised citizens of New Zealand